Temora discaudata is a copepod in the family Temoridae. It was first described in 1849 by James Dwight Dana, being placed in the Calanus genus. It was described as a member of the Temora genus in 1889 by Prussian zoologist Wilhelm Giesbrecht. The female measures between 1.68 mm to 2.05 mm in length, while the male ranges between 1.65 and 1.85 mm. It is found in the Pacific, Indian, and (marginally) Atlantic Oceans.

References

Temoridae
Crustaceans of the Atlantic Ocean
Crustaceans of the Indian Ocean
Crustaceans of the Pacific Ocean
Crustaceans described in 1889